Swetha 5/10 Wellington Road is a 2009 Indian Tamil-Telugu bilingual thriller film directed by Sanjay. The film feature Keerthi Chawla, Krish and Shiv. The film had musical score by Surya and was released on 13 November 2009.

Plot
The college student Swetha (Keerthi Chawla) lives in a bungalow at 5/10 Wellington Road. Her parents and the security guard are not at home for the day so Swetha spends the day swimming in her swimming pool and talking to her boyfriend (Krish), a motorbike racer, on phone. After a motorbike race, Swetha's boyfriend went drinking at the bar and Swetha invites him to her house on phone. Swetha then gets a phonecall and gives her home address. The night, a man with a mask (Shiv) rings at her doorbell and thinking that he is her boyfriend, she takes him to her bedroom. The man finally takes off his mask and he is not her boyfriend. The intruder tells her that he had listened to their phone conversation in a bar and had stolen her boyfriend's mobile phone. With his phone, he posed as a courier boy and asked her address home.

In her bedroom, the intruder blackmails Swetha to share her intimate videos on the internet if she doesn't have sex with him. At that moment, the doorbell rings, the intruder quickly ties her up with ropes and puts her in a closet. At the door, it is the pizza deliveryman and Swetha manages to escape from the closet. A cat-and-mouse game begins between Swetha and the intruder. The intruder finally catches Swetha and he beats her up, therefore, Swetha falls unconscious. Thereafter, Swetha's boyfriend arrives at her house and has a fight with the intruder. The two lovers manage to escape and they hide in the terrasse but they then split up. The intruder catches Swetha once again and attempts to rape her in her bedroom but she manages to escape. At the swimming pool, the intruder tries to stop Swetha and her boyfriend comes to her rescue. The intruder eventually defeats him. The film ends with Swetha killing the intruder by stabbing him in the throat.

Cast
Keerthi Chawla as Swetha
Krish as Swetha's boyfriend
Shiv as the intruder

Production
Sanjay made his directorial debut with the bilingual film Swetha 5/10 Wellington Road being made in Telugu language and Tamil language under the banner of G. Company. Keerthi Chawla was selected to play the title role. She played a glamour role wearing a two-piece swimsuit during the introduction scene. Krish was cast to play the hero while Shiv was chosen to play the villain. The film was predominantly shot in a house in Kochi and a bike race was shot in Bangalore highway. Surya composed the music, the camera work was by S. Vivek Kumar while editing was by V. J. Sabu and Riyas. Speaking of the rape scene featuring in the film, Keerthi Chawla said, "In the beginning, I am very much nervous and feared how it would be. But, when the director makes it for a two days schedule, gradually I lose fear and start enjoying the rape scene. Finally, when the shot was completed I am quite satisfied with my performance".

Soundtrack

The film score and the soundtrack were composed by Surya. The soundtrack features 2 tracks.

References

2009 films
2000s Tamil-language films
2000s Telugu-language films
Indian thriller films
Films shot in Bangalore
Films shot in Kochi
2009 directorial debut films
2009 thriller films
2009 multilingual films
Indian multilingual films